Artine Artinian (December 8, 1907 – November 19, 2005) was a distinguished French literature scholar of Armenian descent, notable for his valuable collection of French literary manuscripts and artwork. He was immortalized as a fictional character by his Bard colleague Mary McCarthy in the novel The Groves of Academe (1952) and by his friend Gore Vidal in the play The Best Man (1960).

Background
Artine Artinian was born in Pazardzhik, Bulgaria to Armenian parents. In 1920, his family came to the United States, settling in Attleboro, Massachusetts. There, Artine worked as a shoeshine boy, learning English from listening to conversations as he worked. He was able to attend Bowdoin College (1931) with support from his customers, and in later years, he returned the favor by establishing a scholarship fund for needy students there. He received a diploma from the Université de Paris in 1932, an A.M. from Harvard the following year, and a Ph.D. from Columbia in 1941. His dissertation, Maupassant Criticism in France, 1880-1940, with an Inquiry into His Present Fame and a Bibliography, was published the same year. By this time, Professor Artinian, who joined the Bard faculty in 1935, had already embarked on his multifaceted career.

In 1949, he had the misfortune to brush up against one of academia's least savory characters, the eminent Belgian deconstructionist Paul de Man. Following his friend Mary McCarthy's recommendation, Artinian helped the newly immigrated de Man by offering him a substitute position as professor of French at Bard College, while Artinian spent the academic year of 1949–50 in France as a Fulbright fellow.

In 1955, he edited and published "The Complete Short Stories of Guy de Maupassant" (Hanover House), which expurgated sixty-five inauthentic works from the Maupassant canon, and remains authoritative, even after half a century. In 1964, Artinian retired from his post as Chairman of the Division of Languages and Literature at Bard. His collecting did not stop with retirement, however, as he continued to amass manuscripts and artwork, especially portraits, including artist self-portraits. He donated a large amount of his collection of manuscripts and art to Bowdoin College and gave artwork to several universities and museums. His portrait collection, including works by André Gill, Henri Demare, Manuel Luque, Émile Cohl, Camille Pissarro, Henri de Toulouse-Lautrec, Anthony Coffey and Paul Signac, is currently housed at the Harry Ransom Center of the University of Texas at Austin.

Artinian died at his home in Lantana, Florida at age 97. Before his death, Professor Artinian was retired professor of French at Bard College, in Annandale-on-Hudson, New York, where he taught for nearly 30 years. An authority on Guy de Maupassant, he had translated and edited what is known to be the definitive English-language edition of Maupassant's short stories.

Literature 
Maupassant as Seen by American and English Writers of Today, 1943
Guy de Maupassant and Louis Le Poittevin, 1948
New Light on the Maupassant Family, 1948
First Publication of Maupassant's Papa de Simon, 1948
Guy de Maupassant and His Brother Herve, 1948
Maupassant's Paris Addresses, Johns Hopkins Press 1949
Maupassant and 'La terre de Virgile, American Association of Teachers of French 1949
Maupassant and Gisèle d'Estoc: A Warning, MLN 1952
Maupassant Criticism in France, 1880-1940, Russell & Russell 1969

References

External links
 Artine Artinian Collection at the Harry Ransom Center at the University of Texas at Austin.
The Artine & Teddy Artinian Self-Portrait Collection at the Turchin Center for the Visual Arts on the campus of Appalachian State University in Boone, North Carolina.
 Encyclopædia Britannica.

1907 births
2005 deaths
Bulgarian people of Armenian descent
Bowdoin College alumni
People from Pazardzhik
People from Lantana, Florida
Bard College faculty
American art collectors
Armenian art collectors
French–English translators
Harvard University alumni
20th-century translators
People from Attleboro, Massachusetts
Columbia University alumni